is a 2002 anime short film. It was nominated at the 75th Academy Awards in the category of Academy Award for Best Animated Short Film.

Plot
It is based on Japanese rakugo of the same title, with a slightly modernized settings. A stingy man eats the pits of some cherries, causing a tree to grow on top of his head. When crowds start converging and partying on his head, being noisy, he got annoyed and uproots the tree. Rainwater pours in the hole, creating a lake. After that, a lot of swimmers converge on this lake, and his head is too noisy again. Enraged, the man commits suicide by throwing himself into the lake on his own head.

Plot of the original rakugo version

The original differs in that, he ate just one cherry with its pit, and instead of swimmers, a lot of anglers converge on his lake and fish hooks are hooked to the man's eyelid and nose.

See also
Japanese folklore
2002 in film

References

External links
 The animation
 
  (Mt. Head)
 The rakugo

2002 films
2002 animated films
2002 anime
2000s Japanese-language films
Japanese short films
Rakugo
Japanese folklore
Japanese literature
Films directed by Kōji Yamamura